This is a list of the winners of the Primetime Emmy Award for Outstanding Made for Television Movie, which is awarded since 1992. The category was originally called Outstanding Drama or Comedy Special.

In 1991, Outstanding Drama or Comedy Special category was merged with Outstanding Miniseries category to form Outstanding Drama or Comedy Special and Miniseries and the number of nominations increased from five to six. For this year, two miniseries had competed with four "made for television movies". The following year, 1992, the new category was split to re-form the Outstanding Miniseries and Outstanding Made for Television Movie categories.

In 2011, the category was merged with the Outstanding Limited Series category to create the Outstanding Miniseries or Movie category. However, in 2014, the decision was reversed, and the separate Miniseries and Television Movie categories were reinstated. Rules were also changed in 2019 requiring at least a 75-minute runtime for movies to be eligible.

In the history of this category, there has been four incidents of ties. The first occurred in 1976 when Eleanor and Franklin: The White House Years tied with Sybil, the second occurred in 1989 when Day One tied with Roe vs. Wade, the third occurred in 1990 when Caroline? tied with The Incident, and the fourth occurred in 1993 when Barbarians at the Gate tied with Stalin.

Winners and nominations

1960s

1970s

1980s

1990s

2000s

2010s

2020s

Programs with multiple wins

3 wins
 Black Mirror (consecutive)

Producers with multiple awards

4 awards
 David Susskind

3 awards
 Charlie Brooker
 Annabel Jones
 Harry R. Sherman

2 awards
 Robert Benedetti
 Dante Di Loreto
 Scott Ferguson
 Glenn Jordan
 Daniel Melnick
 Dorothea G. Petrie
 Marian Rees
 Jay Roach
 George Schaefer
 Aaron Spelling
 E. Duke Vincent
 Paula Weinstein

Programs with multiple nominations
Totals include continuing series, but not sequels or revivals as is the case with Eleanor and Franklin and Eleanor and Franklin: The White House Years, Death of a Salesman and Death of a Salesman, and others.

4 nominations
 Sherlock

3 nominations
 Black Mirror

2 nominations
 Luther

Producers with multiple nominations

8 nominations
 David Susskind

7 nominations
 George Schaefer

6 nominations
 Frank Doelger
 Neil Meron
 Ridley Scott
 Craig Zadan

5 nominations
 Rebecca Eaton
 Scott Ferguson
 Glenn Jordan

4 nominations
 Herbert Brodkin
 Dante Di Loreto
 Alan Landsburg
 Robert Halmi Jr.
 Robert Halmi Sr.
 Barry Levinson
 Steven Moffat
 Marian Rees
 Tracey Scoffield
 Brent Shields
 Martin Starger
 David M. Thompson
 Beryl Vertue
 Sue Vertue
 Paula Weinstein
 Richard Welsh

3 nominations
 Frederick H. Brogger
 Cary Brokaw
 Charlie Brooker
 Robert W. Christiansen
 David Coatsworth
 John Erman
 Tom Fontana
 Sam Haskell
 Hudson Hickman
 Dirk Hoogstra
 Annabel Jones
 Ross Katz
 Frank Konigsberg
 Joe Lazarov
 Kenny Leon
 Richard Levinson
 William Link
 Abby Mann
 Joshua D. Maurer
 Ryan Murphy
 Dolly Parton
 Dorothea G. Petrie
 Lydia Dean Pilcher
 David Puttnam
 Jay Roach
 David A. Rosemount
 Rick Rosenberg
 Edgar J. Scherick
 Tony Scott
 Harry R. Sherman
 Ann Wingate
 David W. Zucker

2 nominations
 Robert Allan Ackerman
 Doro Bachrach
 Alan Ball
 Philip Barry Jr.
 Andrea Baynes
 Robert Benedetti
 Robert Berger
 Halle Berry
 Simon Bosanquet
 Vincent Cirrincione
 Cecil Clarke
 Glenn Close
 Fred Coe
 Shakim Compere
 Robert F. Colesberry
 Celia Costas
 Richard Dale
 Peter Douglas
 Nancy Dubuc
 Peter K. Duchow
 John M. Eckert
 Brad Falchuk
 Delia Fine
 Bill Finnegan
 John Frankenheimer
 Dede Gardner
 James Garner
 David Gerber
 Clara George
 Nick Gillott
 David R. Ginsburg
 Tim Goodchild
 Mark Gordon
 Linda Gottlieb
 Thomas M. Hammel
 Andy Harries
 Michael Hausman
 Richard Heus
 Anne Hopkins
 Juliette Howell
 Bethan Jones
 Queen Latifah
 Norman Lear
 Mary Lisio
 Fay Kanin
 John Kemeny
 Pamela Koffler

 Audrey Maas
 Peter Macdissi
 Michael Mahoney
 Philip Mandelker
 Sam Manners
 Stan Margulies
 Tony Mark
 Craig McNeil
 Daniel Melnick
 Stephen Merchant
 Leanne Moore
 Peter Morgan
 Oren Moverman
 Nellie Rachel Nugiel
 David J. O'Connell
 Richard L. O'Connor
 Bill O'Reilly
 Frances Croke Page
 Robert Papazian
 Charlie Parsons
 Julie Payne
 George W. Perkins
 Brad Pitt
 Jon Plowman
 Marykay Powell
 Ilene Kahn Power
 Michael Prupas
 David W. Rintels
 Edwin Self
 Bernard Sofronski
 Jason Sosnoff
 Steve Spielberg
 Aaron Spelling
 Shelby Stone
 Ernest Tidyman
 Suzanne Todd
 Christine Vachon
 Chrisann Verges
 David Victor
 E. Duke Vincent
 Kerry Washington
 Teri Weinberg
 John Wells
 Oprah Winfrey
 Alexis Martin Woodall

Total awards by network

 HBO – 22
 NBC – 9
 CBS – 8
 ABC – 5
 Netflix – 4
 Disney+ – 1
 PBS – 1
 Syndicated – 1
 TNT – 1

See also
 Primetime Emmy Award for Outstanding Limited Series
 Primetime Emmy Award for Outstanding Miniseries or Movie
 TCA Award for Outstanding Achievement in Movies, Miniseries and Specials
 Golden Globe Award for Best Miniseries or Television Film

Notes

References

External links
 Primetime Emmy Awards

Made for Television Movie